Ahmed Gaid Salah (13 January 1940 – 23 December 2019) was a senior leader in the Algerian People's National Army. In 2004, he was appointed by then-President Abdelaziz Bouteflika to the position of chief of staff of the army. On 15 September 2013, he was appointed Deputy Minister of Defense. Gaid Salah was promoted to the rank of General in 1993. He was married and father of seven children. Gaid Salah served as Algeria's de facto leader in 2019.

Biography
On 26 March 2019, after months of unrelenting anti-Bouteflika protests, Gaid Salah compelled President Bouteflika to resign.  The president handed over his resignation under intense public pressure after having announced that he was seeking reelection for a fifth term. Later, in an effort to ease public tension, General Gaid Salah ordered the arrest of the president's brother and close adviser, Said Bouteflika, alleging that he was conspiring with two former intelligence chiefs, retired General Toufik Mediene and General Tartag, to make changes in the leadership of the armed forces, including the removal of Gaid Salah himself from his top position.

In an effort to remove opposition, General Gaid Salah ordered the arrest of two former prime ministers as well as other former ministers and several business leaders who were close to presidential advisor Said Bouteflika. His actions at that point gained him a lot of public support. The anti-corruption activity that started in the second quarter of 2019 was used by the Algerian anti-government movement as an opportunity to demand that the military hand over power to a civilian government, a demand that was rejected by General Gaid Salah. Instead, General Gaid Salah said that only a presidential election could bring the country out of its political crisis.

Death
Gaid Salah suffered a heart attack on the morning of 23 December 2019 and was rushed to a military hospital in Algiers, where he died a few hours later. He was 79 years old. His last public appearance was four days earlier when he received the National Order of Merit from President Abdelmadjid Tebboune. After his funeral, he was buried on 25 December 2019 at  El-Alia cemetery, Algiers.

Honours

 Collar of the National Order of Merit (Algeria) 
 Medal of the Order of Military Merit (Algeria)
 Medal of Bravery (Algeria)
 Medal of Courage (Algeria)
 Medal of Honour (Algeria)
 Medal of Longevity and Exemplary Service (Algeria)
 Medal for participation in the Middle East Wars 1967 and 1973 (Algeria)
 Commander of the Order of the Republic of Tunisia

References

1940 births
2019 deaths
People from Batna, Algeria
Government ministers of Algeria
Algerian generals
Members of the National Liberation Front (Algeria)
Chaoui people
21st-century Algerian people